Germany competed at the 2020 Summer Paralympics in Tokyo, Japan, from 24 August to 5 September 2021. This was their sixteenth consecutive appearance at the Summer Paralympics since 1960.

Medalists

Competitors
The following is the list of number of competitors participating in the Games:

Archery 

Germany earned one quota place at the 2019 Para Archery World Championships held in Den Bosch, Netherlands.

|-
|align=left|Maik Szarszewski
|align=left|Men's individual recurve open
|569
|29
|W 6–2
|W 6–0
|L 2–6
|colspan=3|Did not advance
|}

Athletics 

Johannes Floors, Niko Kappel, Felix Streng, Markus Rehm, Felix Streng, Sebastian Dietz, Katrin Mueller-Rottgardt, Irmgard Bensusan, Frances Herrmann and Birgit Kober are among the athletes to represent Germany in athletics.

Men's track

Men's field

Women's track

Women's field

Mixed track

Badminton 

Germany has qualified a total of six para-badminton players for each of the following events into the Paralympic tournament based on the Para Badminton World Rankings.
Men

Women

Mixed

Boccia 

Boris Nicolai qualified for Germany in Individual BC4 events. This is the first time that Germany will compete in this sport.

Cycling 

Men's road

Women's road

Mixed road

Men's track

 
Women's track

Equestrian 

Germany qualified for the 2020 Summer Paralympics after reaching 1st place in the 2018 FEI World Equestrian Games. The team includes Saskia Deutz, Heidemarie Dresing, Regine Mispelkamp and Steffen Zeibig.

Goalball

Men

Group stage

Judo 

Four German judoka have qualified to compete at the Games.
Men

Women

Paracanoeing 

Germany qualified six paracanoeists.

Paratriathlon

Rowing

Germany qualified two boats in the single sculls events for the games. Sylvia Pille-Steppat will compete in the women's single sculls by finishing sixth at the 2019 World Rowing Championships in Ottensheim, Austria and securing one of seventh available place. Meanwhile, Marcus Klemp will compete in the men's single sculls events by winning the gold medal at the 2021 Final Paralympic Qualification Regatta in Gavirate, Italy.

Qualification Legend: FA=Final A (medal); FB=Final B (non-medal); R=Repechage

Shooting

Germany entered four athletes into the Paralympic competition. All of them successfully break the Paralympic qualification at the 2018 WSPS World Championships which was held in Cheongju, South Korea, 2018 WSPS World Cup which was held in Châteauroux, France, 2019 WSPS World Cup which was held in Al Ain, United Arab Emirates and 2019 WSPS World Championships which was held in Sydney, Australia.

Sitting volleyball 

Germany have qualified to compete at the Games in the sitting volleyball.

Summary

Men's tournament 

Group play

Fifth Place Match

Swimming 

Men

Women

Table tennis

Germany entered eight athletes into the table tennis competition at the games. Thomas Schmidberger & Valentin Baus qualified from 2019 ITTF European Para Championships which was held in Helsingborg, Sweden and six other athletes via World Ranking allocation.

Men

Women

Wheelchair basketball 

Germany men's team qualified for the 2020 Summer Paralympics after entered top four at the 2019 IWBF Men's European Championship.

Germany's women's team qualified for the 2020 Summer Paralympics after winning the bronze medal in the 2018 Wheelchair Basketball World Championship held in Hamburg, Germany.

Summary

Men

Group play

Quarter-final

Seventh place match

Women
Group play

Quarter-final

Semi-final

Bronze medal match

Wheelchair fencing 

Maurice Schmidt and Sylvi Tauber have been selected to compete.

Men

Women

Wheelchair tennis

See also 
 Germany at the Paralympics
 Germany at the 2020 Summer Olympics

References

External links 
 2020 Summer Paralympics website

Nations at the 2020 Summer Paralympics
2020
Summer Paralympics